This is a list of Cities and towns in the South Island of New Zealand:

A

 Akaroa
 Albert Town
 Albury
 Alexandra
 Amberley
 Anakiwa
 Appleby
 Arthur's Pass
 Arrowtown
 Ashburton
 Ashburton Forks
 Athol
 Aylesbury

B

 Balclutha
 Balfour
 Beaumont
 Belfast
 Birdlings Flat
 Blackball
 Blenheim
 Bluff
 Brighton
 Brightwater
 Bronte
 Browns
 Brunner
 Bulwer
 Burnham

C

 Cable Bay
 Canvastown
 Cashmere
 Cass
 Cave
 Charleston
 Cheviot
 Christchurch
 Clarence
 Clarksville
 Coalgate
 Colac Bay
 Collingwood
 Cromwell
 Crushington
 Culverden

D

 Dacre
 Darfield
 Denniston
 Diamond Harbour
 Dipton
 Dobson
 Dodson Valley
 Douglas
 Doyleston
 Drummond
 Dunedin
 Dunsandel
 Duntroon

E

 Ealing
 Edendale
 Eiffelton
 Eyreton

F

 Fairhall
 Fairlie
 Fortrose
 Frankton
 Franz Josef / Waiau

G

 Geraldine
 Glenavy
 Glencoe
 Glenduan
 Glenorchy
 Glentunnel
 Gore
 Granity
 Greendale
 Greymouth
 Grove Bush
 Grovetown

H

 Haast
 Hakataramea
 Hampden
 Hanmer Springs
 Hardwicke
 Harihari
 Havelock
 Hawarden
 Lake Hāwea
 Hawksbury
 Hedgehope
 Henley
 Herbert
 Hinds
 Hira, New Zealand
 Hokitika
 Hope
 Hornby
 Hundalee
 Hyde

I

 Inangahua Junction
 Inchbonnie
 Invercargill

J
 Jack's Bay

K

 Kaiapoi
 Kaikōura
 Kaitangata
 Kaiteriteri
 Kaka Point
 Kakanui
 Karamea
 Karitane
 Kennington
 Kingston
 Kirwee
 Koromiko
 Kumara
 Kurow

L

 Lake Tekapo
 Lawrence
 Leeston
 Leithfield
 Lincoln
 Linkwater
 Little River
 Longbeach, Canterbury
 Long Beach, Otago
 Longbush
 Lowcliffe
 Lumsden
 Lynnford
 Lyttelton

M

 Mabel Bush
 Macandrew Bay
 Maclennan
 Makarora
 Makarewa
 Manapouri
 Māpua
 Mārahau
 Mataura
 Maungati
 Mayfield, Canterbury
 Mayfield, Marlborough
 Medbury
 Methven
 Middlemarch
 Milburn
 Millers Flat
 Milton
 Moenui
 Moeraki
 Momona
 Mosgiel
 Mossburn
 Motueka
 Mount Cook Village
 Mount Somers
 Murchison
 Myross Bush

N

 Naseby
 Nelson
 New Brighton
 Ngahere
 Ngākuta Bay
 Ngapara
 Ngātīmoti
 Nightcaps

O

 Oamaru
 Oban
 Ohai
 Ohoka
 Okuru
 Omakau
 Omarama
 Onekaka
 Orepuki
 Otakou
 Otematata
 Otira
 Outram
 Owaka
 Oxford

P

 Paerau
 Pahia
 Palmerston
 Papatowai
 Paradise
 Parnassus
 Paroa
 Patearoa
 Pelorus Bridge
 Picton
 Pleasant Point
 Port Chalmers
 Port Levy
 Portobello
 Pounawea
 Pukekura
 Pukeuri
 Punakaiki
 Pūponga

Q
 Queenstown

R

 Raes Junction
 Rai Valley
 Rakahouka
 Rakaia
 Ranfurly
 Rangiora
 Rapaura
 Rārangi
 Reefton
 Renwick
 Richmond
 Riverlands
 Riverton / Aparima
 Riwaka
 Rolleston
 Romahapa
 Roslyn Bush
 Ross
 Rotherham
 Rotoroa
 Roxburgh
 Ruatapu
 Runanga

S

 Saint Arnaud
 Saint Bathans
 Seddon
 Sheffield and Waddington
 Somerfield
 Southbridge
 Spencerville
 Spring Creek
 Springfield
 Springhills
 Springston
 Stillwater
 Stoke

T

 Tahakopa
 Tahora
 Tāhunanui
 Tākaka
 Tapanui
 Tapawera
 Te Anau
 Te Kuha
 Templeton
 Temuka
 Te Taho
 Te Tipua
 The Brook
 Timaru
 Tinwald
 Todds Valley
 Tokanui
 Tokarahi
 Tophouse
 Tōtaranui
 Tuamarina
 Tuatapere
 Twizel

U
 Upper Moutere

V
 Valetta

W

 Waiau
 Waikari
 Waikawa, Marlborough
 Waikawa, Southland
 Waikouaiti
 Waimangaroa
 Waimate
 Waipara
 Waipiata
 Wairau Valley
 Waitahuna
 Waitane
 Waitaria Bay
 Waitati
 Waitohi
 Wakefield
 Wānaka
 Ward
 Warrington
 Wedderburn
 West Eyreton
 Weston
 Westport
 Wharanui
 Whataroa
 Whitecliffs
 Winscombe
 Winton
 Witherlea
 Woodend
 Woodlands
 Woodstock
 Wyndham

See also 
List of cities and towns in the South Island by population

South Island
Cities and towns in the South Island